Sudha Belawadi is an Indian actress in the Kannada film industry, and a theatre artist in Karnataka, India. Some of the notable films of Sudha Belawadi as actress include Mathadana (2001), Mungaru Male (2006), Moggina Manasu (2008), Kaadu (1973).

Career 
Sudha Belawadi has been a part of more than 70 films, many drama (theatre) plays, and soaps/serials Manthana, Manvanthara, Mahaparva.

Selected filmography 

 Aduva Gombe (2019)
 Kaafi Thota (2017)
 Puta Thirugisi Nodi (2016)
 Vaastu Prakaara (2015)
 Hejjegalu (2013)
 Bacchan (2013)
 Googly (2013)
 Thamassu (2010)
 Prem Kahani (2009)
 Bhagyada Balegaara (2009)
 Kaaranji (2009)
 Gaalipata (2008)...Ganesh's mother
 Meera Madhava Raghava (2007)
 Mungaru Male (2006)...Kamala
 Joke Falls (2004)
 Mysore Masala: The UFO Incident (2019)
 Act 1978 (2020)...Sabiha Bhanu
 Arishadvarga (2020)
 Gaalipata 2 (2021)

Personal life 
She is the daughter of Kannada actress Bhargavi Narayan and Belavadi Nanjundaiah Narayana (a.k.a.  'makeup nani' ), a Kannada film actor, and a makeup artist. Her siblings are Sujatha, Prakash and Pradeep. Prakash is an Indian theatre, film, television and media personality, and a National Film Award recipient, for his directorial film Stumble in 2002.

Sudha is married to M.G.Sathya Rao and their children are Shantanu and Samyukta. Samyukta, is also a Kannada film actress.

See also

List of people from Karnataka
Cinema of Karnataka
List of Indian film actresses
Cinema of India

References

External links

Actresses in Kannada cinema
Living people
Kannada people
Actresses from Karnataka
Actresses from Bangalore
Indian film actresses
20th-century Indian actresses
21st-century Indian actresses
Actresses in Kannada television
Actresses in Kannada theatre
Year of birth missing (living people)